Darren Spencer Baker (born 28 June 1965) is an English former professional footballer, who played as a midfielder. He made appearances in the English Football League with Wrexham. He also played in the Welsh League for Bangor City.

References

1965 births
Living people
English footballers
Association football midfielders
Wrexham A.F.C. players
Bangor City F.C. players
English Football League players
Sportspeople from Wednesbury